Wilhelm von Finck (born 6 February 1848 - 4 April 1924) was a German entrepreneur and banker. Finck was a co-founder of the German companies Allianz and Munich Re.

Life 
In Frankfurt am Main, he was a student at the Hasselsche Institut. He worked first for German company Bankhaus Philipp Nicolaus Schmidt. Since 1869 he worked for Nestle, Andreae & Co. in London and since 1870 for Merck Finck & Co. in Darmstadt. By 1879, together with his brother August Finck, who replaced the departing general Adolf Karl Ludwig Christian, the previous authorized representative Wilhelm von Finck already held a large part of the bank assets of Merck Finck & Co.

Together with German entrepreneur Theodor von Cramer-Klett and Carl von Thieme he founded company Munich Re in April 1880. German company Allianz AG was founded in Berlin on 5 February 1890 by then director of the Munich Reinsurance Company (Munich Re) Carl von Thieme (a native of Erfurt, whose father was the director of Thuringia) and Wilhelm von Finck.

Personal life
In 1886, he married Marie Fäustle and they had four children. One of his children was German businessman August von Finck Sr. (1898-1980).

Awards 
 Merit Order of the Bavarian Crown

Literature 
 Bernhard Hoffmann: Wilhelm von Finck 1848-1924. Lebensbild eines deutschen Bankiers, Verlag Beck, München 1953.
 Bernhard Hoffmann: Finck, Wilhelm Peter von. In: Neue Deutsche Biographie (NDB). Band 5, Duncker & Humblot, Berlin 1961, p. 150 f. (Digitalisat).
 Genealogisches Handbuch des Adels, Adelslexikon Band III, Band 61 der Gesamtreihe, C. A. Starke Verlag, Limburg (Lahn) 1975, ISSN 0435-2408.
 Genealogisches Handbuch des in Bayern immatrikulierten Adels, Band XXV; 2004. 62, Vereinigung des Adels in Bayern. Verlag : Degener, 
 Marita Krauss: Die Finks. Eine Dynastie der Hochfinanz zwischen Wirtschaft und Politik, in: Marita Krauss (Hrsg.): Die bayerischen Kommerzienräte - Eine deutsche Wirtschaftselite von 1880 bis 1928, Volk Verlag, München 2016, p. 258–264.

References

External links 
 Haus der Bayrischen Geshichte: Wilhelm von Finck
 Zeit.de: Sorgen eines Milliardärs (german)

Members of the Bavarian Reichsrat
19th-century German businesspeople
20th-century German businesspeople
Businesspeople in insurance
German company founders
Finck family
Businesspeople from Hesse
1848 births
1924 deaths
People from Wetteraukreis